A splenic tumor is a rare form of tumor that may be malignant or benign. Malignant forms include lymphoma and sarcoma.

Lymphoma is the most common malignant splenic tumor.

References

External links 

Lymphatic organ neoplasia
Hematopathology
Lymphoma